Zhang Xiaoya (born 4 October 1992) is a Chinese female volleyball player. She is part of the China women's national volleyball team. On club level she played for Sichuan in 2015.

Clubs
  Sichuan (2009–Present)
  Supreme Chonburi (2019)

Awards

Individuals
 2016 Montreux Volley Masters "Best Middle Blocker"
 2019 Thai–Denmark Super League "Best Middle Blocker"

Club
 2019 Thai–Denmark Super League -  Champion, with Supreme Chonburi
 2019-2020 Volleyball Thailand League -  Champion, with Supreme Chonburi

National team 
2014 Asian Cup —  Champion
2014 Asian Games —  Silver Medal
2015 World Cup —  Champion
2016 Montreux Volley Masters —  Champion
2016 World Grand Prix — 5th place
2016 Asian Cup —  Champion

References

1992 births
Living people
Chinese women's volleyball players
Volleyball players from Sichuan
Place of birth missing (living people)
Volleyball players at the 2014 Asian Games
Asian Games medalists in volleyball
Medalists at the 2014 Asian Games
Asian Games silver medalists for China
Sportspeople from Chengdu
Middle blockers
21st-century Chinese women